Antony de Vit (12 September 1957 – 2 July 1998) was an English DJ and music producer. He is considered one of the most influential of his generation. He was credited with helping to take the "hard house" and fast "hard NRG" sounds out of the London and Birmingham gay scene into mainstream clubs. His single "Burning Up" reached number 25 on the UK Singles Chart in March 1995, with "To the Limit" making number 44 in September 1995. During that year, he won BBC Radio 1 Essential Mix of the Year Award, as voted by listeners of the show, and Music Weeks re-mix of Year Award for Louise's "Naked". He remixed many UK top 40 hits during his career with artists like Taylor Dayne and East 17. Between 1994 and 1998 his popularity with the clubbing public was rivaled by only Paul Oakenfold and Carl Cox. In September 2010, Mixmag UK announced the nominations of 35 DJs chosen by other big names in the world of dance music as those they considered the best DJs ever. A subsequent 15-month survey, which polled hundreds of thousands of global votes, asked who was the "greatest DJ of all time" and when the result was announced in January 2011, de Vit was ranked number 9 and one of four British DJs who made the top 10.

Early life
Antony de Vit was born to Raymond de Vit and June Silcock in Kidderminster, England. Through his father's family, he was directly related to Charles Anatole de Vit, a wealthy French immigrant who migrated to the UK in the 1840s. Kidderminster has also been the family's home since the mid-1930s.

Career
Tony de Vit began DJing at the age of 17, as a wedding DJ in 1976 playing at local pubs in his home town of Kidderminster, followed in his early 20s, by his first residency at the Nightingale in Birmingham on a Monday night where he played pop and hi-NRG. He would often have to sweep floors and empty ashtrays after the club had closed. In a relatively short space of time de Vit, through his talent and the diversity of his music, helped maintain the Nightingale as a respected club. During the early 1980s, he worked at Wolverhampton's Beacon Radio, playing club tracks during a regular late-night slot on the show hosted by Mike Baker of Smooth FM.

It was around 1988 that London's famous gay superclub, Heaven was looking for an alternative DJ. De Vit landed the spot there, playing the main floor two Saturdays a month. Heaven was regarded as the top gay club in the UK at this time, and de Vit's sets there rapidly established his reputation.

In 1990, another soon-to-be-influential club named Trade emerged onto the scene, promoted by Laurence Malice and Tim Stabler. De Vit was a regular visitor to Trade, where he began to bombard the promoters with cassette tapes of his sets. Eventually, they relented and allowed de Vit to stand in one night for DJ Smokin' Jo. Following his set, de Vit landed his own residency at Trade. Later in his career he would perform a 12-hour DJ set on two occasions at Trade; some consider these his defining moments as a DJ.

In 1992, the illegal raves in the UK moved into the clubs in a bid to legalise the scene. One of the key figures of the house music scene at this time was a Birmingham promoter called Simon Raine, who took an interest in de Vit's career. He put de Vit on the bill alongside Fabio and Grooverider at The Institute and encouraged him to make 'in roads' into other house parties as de Vit had predominately played in the gay club scene. Raine had launched the successful Gatecrasher club nights and, taking his advice, de Vit played at the 'Chuff Chuff' events sharing the bill with Sasha.

In the same year, de Vit teamed up with Simon Parkes to create the V2 recording studio based in The Custard Factory, Gibb St, Birmingham (Unit 417) with a view to co-write new material for de Vit to play within his sets.

It was at this time that he recorded and released his first record, "Feel the Love" which was well received on the club scene. His second release was a track called "Higher & Higher" (with disco diva Norma Lewis), which became the future benchmark for de Vit and Parkes' V2 concept. But it was de Vit's/Parkes' track "Burning Up" that took everybody by surprise, going straight in at No. 24 on the UK top 40 charts.

In 1995, Radio 1 contacted de Vit for his first Essential Mix. At the same time, record companies recognised his talent and technical ability, and de Vit featured on no less than twelve of the top compilation dance mix albums during this year including Fantazia House Collection Volume 2 and the Remixers album, Sound Dimension's Retrospective of House Volumes 2 & 4, Boxed's Global Underground series Live in Tel Aviv, Live in Tokyo, Kiss Mix 97, Trade Volumes 1 & 3, and the international release, Trade Global Grooves.

With the launch of Jump Wax Records in 1996, hard house music in the UK became more mainstream. De Vit's "Are You All Ready?" and "I Don't Care" received major radio play and strong sales upon release. Following the closure of Jump Wax Records in 1996, de Vit launched his own label (TDV Records), which saw him release "Bring the Beat Back" and "Get Loose", both co-written with Simon Parkes. De Vit went on to play at many major dance clubs/events in the UK during this time, including Legacy @ The Manor in Ringwood, Slinky @ the Opera House in Bournemouth, Cream, Gatecrasher, Godskitchen, and Creamfields. He garnered a string of awards and nominations during the year, including Mixmags '2nd Best DJ of the Year 1996', M8 magazine's 'Best DJ of the Year 1996' and was selected by Music Week as 'Top Remixer of 1996'. His remix of Louise's "Naked" earned Music Weeks vote as the 'Ground breaking Remix of 1996'.

In 1997, de Vit was offered a show on 'Kiss 100'. He was ranked number 5 in DJ Magazines Top 100 DJs in the World the same year. In early 1998, de Vit recorded "The Dawn" with Paul Janes and Andy Buckley, which was part of the six-track Trade EP. De Vit commented that he was 'very proud of it'. Paul Janes went on to remix "The Dawn" as a personal tribute to de Vit's work. The track has often been considered to be his best work. On May 2, 1998, de Vit performed a set in the Trade tent at the very first Creamfields festival in Winchester.

Death
De Vit had contracted HIV. On 2 July 1998, at the age of 40, he died of bronchial failure and bone marrow failure at Heartlands Hospital in East Birmingham, England. He had collapsed a few days earlier during a holiday in Miami, Florida. After De Vit's death, a conflict kept his records off the shelves for many years, but finally a compilation album of his songs and remixes was released called Are You All Ready? on Tidy Trax records.

Influence
A number of artists have cited Tony De Vit as an influence, such as Fergie, Andy Farley, Dave Pearce, Paul F1 King, Steven J, and Lisa Lashes.

Discography
Releases

Albums

 Are You Ready 2xCD, Tidy Trax, (2003)

Singles & EP's

 Feel the love/Make love to me (12"), V2, (1993).
 Burning Up (7 versions), Icon Records, (1995).
 To the Limit (4 versions), Xplode Records/PWL International, (1995).
 99th Floor Elevator's (5 versions) featuring Tony De Vit-Hooked, Labello Dance/PWL International, (1995).
 99th Floor Elevator's (3 versions) featuring Tony De Vit-I'll be There, PWL International, (1996)
 I Don't Care/Resistance is Futile (9 versions), Jump Wax Records, (1996).
 Are You All Ready/UFO (4 versions), Jump Wax Records, (1996)
 Feel My Love/Get Loose (3 versions), TDV Records, (1997).
 Bring the Beat Back (Club & Trade Mixes) (12" White Label), TdV Records, (1997).
 Don't Ever Stop/Bring the Beat Back (3 versions), TdV Records, (1998).
 Steve Thomas/Tony De Vit-Trade EP Disc 02 (12" EP), Trade Records, (1998).
 Tony De Vit featuring Petronella-Do What You Do (3 versions), TdV Records, (1998)
 Paul King/TdV-Kick it In/Bring the Beat Back (3 versions), TdV Records, (1998).
 Splash Down/Are You All Ready (2 versions), Tidy Trax, (1999).
 The Dawn (3 versions), Tidy Trax, (2000)
 Tony De Vit-Stimulant DJ's (Tidy Trax Sound EP 12"), Tidy Trax, (2000)
 Destination (2 versions), Plenty Records, (2002)
 Tony De Vit (feat) Niki Mak-Give Me A Reason (4 versions), Tidy Two, (2003).
 Give Me A Reason/Bring the Beat Back (12" TP), Tidy Two, (2003).
 The Dawn/I Don't Care (12"), Tidy White, (2004).
 Tony De Vit/Lee Haslam-The Dawn/The Music is a Drug (12"), Tidy Classics, (2005).

DJ Mixes

 Mark Moore/Tony De Vit-Chuff Chuff Chuff Summer Ball 93 (2 cassette mixed), (1993).
 The Fantazia House Collection 2 (CD3) – Tony de Vit (1995).
 The Remixers-Tony De Vit (CD Mix), Fantazia Records, (1995).
 Tony De Vit & Jon of the Pleased Wimmin live at Bangkok (1995).
 A Retrospective of House '91-'95 2 (CD2) – Tony de Vit (1995).
 A Retrospective of House '91-'96 4 (CD1) – Tony de Vit (1996).
 Trade Volume Three, Steve Thomas (CD1) & Tony De Vit (CD2), Feverpitch, (1996).
 Global Underground GU001 Live in Tel Aviv (4 versions), Global Underground Ltd, (1996).
 An Introspective of House 3 (CD2) – Tony de Vit (1997).
 Graham Gold and Tony De Vit-Kiss Mix 97 (2x Mix CD), Polygram, (1997).
 Jim 'Shaft' Ryan-Mark Moore-Tony De Vit-Glamorous One, Miss Moneypenny's Music, (1997).
 Global Underground GU005 Tokyo (5 versions), Boxed, (1997).
 Trade Global Grooves Volume 1 (2 versions), Feverpitch, (1997).
 Seb Fontaine-Tony De Vit-Elements (1st Testament) (2x CD Mix Compilation), Warner Music UK Ltd, (1998).

Discography other releases
Notes: This section includes the body of Tony De Vit's work other than his own releases during his career.

Appearances (170)
Include:
Albums (4)
Compilations (51)
Mixes (109)
Singles & EP's(5)
Videos (1)

Unofficial (32)

Mixes (27)
Singles & EP's (5)

Credits (304)
Acting, Literary and Spoken (1)
Featuring and Presenting (8)
DJ Mix (25)
Production (35)
Remix (2013)
Technical (4)
Writing and Arrangement (18)

Awards & nominations

BBC Radio 1 Awards

British Entertainment and Dance Awards

DJ Magazine Awards

DJ Awards

International Dance Music Awards

Music Week Awards

M8 Magazine Awards

Muzik Magazine Awards

Mix Mag Awards

Vice Magazine/Thump TV

References

External links

1957 births
1998 deaths
English dance musicians
Club DJs
British hi-NRG musicians
English record producers
Remixers
People from Kidderminster
AIDS-related deaths in England
LGBT DJs
English people of French descent
English gay musicians
Electronic dance music DJs
20th-century English musicians
20th-century English LGBT people